Teodoro Sampaio is a municipality in the state of Bahia in the North-East region of Brazil.

References

Municipalities in Bahia